Soviet Union national field hockey team may refer to:
 Soviet Union men's national field hockey team
 Soviet Union women's national field hockey team